Arlene Sierra is an American composer of contemporary classical music, working in London, United Kingdom.

Education
Sierra studied at Oberlin College Conservatory of Music, Yale University School of Music and the University of Michigan, Ann Arbor, receiving a DMA in 1999; her principal teachers were Martin Bresnick, Michael Daugherty and Jacob Druckman. A composition fellow at the Britten-Pears School (Aldeburgh Festival) in 2000 and Tanglewood in 2001, teachers included Louis Andriessen, Magnus Lindberg, and Colin Matthews. She also worked with Judith Weir at the Dartington International Summer School in 1999, Paul-Heinz Dittrich in Berlin in 1997-8, and Betsy Jolas at The American Conservatory of Fontainebleau Schools in 1993.

Career
Sierra's music has been commissioned by organizations including the Seattle Symphony, Tanglewood Music Festival, the New York Philharmonic, the Huddersfield Contemporary Music Festival, the Albany Symphony, the Cheltenham International Festival, the Jerome, PRS and Cheswatyr Foundations, and the Ralph Vaughan Williams Trust. Performers of her work have included New York City Opera VOX, the American Composers Orchestra, the London Sinfonietta, the New Music Players, Psappha, the International Contemporary Ensemble, Chroma, the Schubert Ensemble, the BBC National Orchestra of Wales, and the Tokyo Philharmonic.

In 2001, she was the first woman to win the Takemitsu Prize; in 2007 she received a Charles Ives Fellowship from the American Academy of Arts and Letters with a citation for music, "by turns, urgent, poetic, evocative and witty." In 2011, a debut CD of chamber music was released by Bridge Records: Arlene Sierra, Volume 1 and she was named Composer of the Year by the Classical Recording Foundation. A second CD, Game of Attrition: Arlene Sierra, Vol. 2, was released in 2014 including four orchestral works recorded by the BBC National Orchestra of Wales, Jac Van Steen, conductor. In the same year, Moler, an orchestral work commissioned by the Seattle Symphony, was nominated for a Latin Grammy Award. Sierra's latest release on the Bridge label, Butterflies Remember a Mountain – Arlene Sierra, Vol. 3 (2018) is a chamber disc including performances by Nicola Benedetti, Leonard Elschenbroich, the Horszowski Trio, and Quattro Mani. Sierra has been named Composer-in-Association with the Utah Symphony for the 2020-21 season.

Sierra was a Composition Tutor at Cambridge University in 2003-4 before joining Cardiff University School of Music in 2004, where she is Professor of Composition.

Her music is published  by Cecilian Music (ASCAP).

Musical style
Sierra's compositions are rooted in early training in classical piano and in electronic music at the Oberlin Conservatory of Music.

Many of Sierra's mature works have their origins in military strategy and game theory, with literary sources including Vitruvius and Sun Tzu, notably: Ballistae (2000) for large ensemble and Surrounded Ground (2008) for sextet, as well as Art of War (2010), a concerto for piano and orchestra.

Sierra is also inspired by bird song, insect calls, and sounds and processes from the natural world including Butterflies Remember a Mountain (2013), a piano trio which was inspired by a peculiar detour in the annual mass migration of monarch butterflies. This trio was the starting point for her Nature Symphony (2017) commissioned by the BBC Philharmonic and BBC Radio 3. Other works that employ natural sounds and processes include Cicada Shell (2006) for ensemble, Birds and Insects, Books 1 and 2 (2007, 2015) for piano solo, Insects in Amber (2010) for string quartet, and Urban Birds (2014) for three pianos with percussion and electronics.

These two interests – nature and military strategy – are both evident in her 2009 orchestral work Game of Attrition which takes its structure from processes described by Charles Darwin in The Origin of Species.

Sierra has also demonstrated an interest in dramatic and stage works centered on women protagonists, in scenarios ranging from Faust in the opera Faustine to human trafficking in the collaborative chamber opera Cuatro Corridos. Since 2012, she has been working on a series of new scores to films by Maya Deren, including Meditation on Violence and Ritual in Transfigured Time.

See also
 List of compositions by Arlene Sierra

Articles and interviews
'A Meeting of Strategic Minds: Arlene Sierra's music scores Susan Vencl's dance' Hanover, Muriel, New York Theatre Wire / News Blaze, Published Spring 2018
'Unflinching Depictions of Nature – A Conversation with Arlene Sierra Natural Light, Published September 7, 2015
 'Ten Questions to Arlene Sierra' Sinfini Music, Published April 29, 2014
 'The Evolution of Process' Gardner, Alexandra, New Music Box Published: May 1, 2013
'Composer Arlene Sierra: Process, Strategy, Evolution' Schulslaper, Robert, Fanfare (magazine) Published: October 13, 2011
'CompositionToday: Arlene Sierra Interview' Published: November 24, 2009 
'Contact – by Arlene Sierra' NewMusicBox Published: December 16, 2009

Footnotes

External links
Arlene Sierra, Official Site
Arlene Sierra, Cardiff University School of Music

20th-century classical composers
21st-century American composers
21st-century classical composers
American women classical composers
American classical composers
British classical composers
Living people
University of Michigan School of Music, Theatre & Dance alumni
20th-century British composers
21st-century British composers
20th-century American women musicians
21st-century American women musicians
20th-century American composers
Year of birth missing (living people)
20th-century women composers
21st-century women composers